Anushka Patel is the Vice Principal Director and Chief Scientist at The George Institute for Global health, a Professor of Medicine at the University of New South Wales, and Cardiologist at the Royal Prince Alfred Hospital.

Career 
Patel completed her medical training at the University of Queensland, and then obtained a Master of Science in Epidemiology at Harvard University and a PhD from University of Sydney.

Patel's research is focused on improving cardiovascular care in the community and in acute care hospital settings. and she also leads research projects in Australia, China and India. She is supported by a Principal Research Fellowship from the Australian National Health and Medical Research Council (NHMRC).

She describes her motivations for treating those with heart disease, “Initially I was interested in how we could improve the treatment for people who are very sick with heart disease, such as those who have suffered a heart attack. However, as time went by, I became more interested in how you actually prevent this heart attack in the first place, because it is probably a lot more beneficial to the population if you can prevent it". Patel wrote an essay on "Making Asia fit for Growth" for the Asia Society in Australia.

Awards and recognition 
 2018 — awarded Australian Academy of Science Gustav Nossal Medal for Global Health.
 2015 — elected Fellow of the Australian Academy of Health and Medical Sciences.
 2011 — named one of the 100 most influential people in Sydney by The Sydney Morning Herald.
 2006 — received the Peter Bancroft Prize from the University of Sydney in 2006.

References 

Living people
Australian women academics
Clinical trials
Year of birth missing (living people)
Australian cardiologists
Women cardiologists
Academic staff of the University of New South Wales
University of Queensland alumni
Harvard School of Public Health alumni
University of Sydney alumni
Fellows of the Australian Academy of Health and Medical Sciences